A slingshot is a small hand-powered projectile weapon.

Slingshot may also refer to:

Technology
 Gravitational slingshot, the use of a planet's gravity to alter the path and speed of a spacecraft
 Slingshot (ISP), a New Zealand internet service provider
 Slingshot (water vapor distillation system), an invention by Dean Kamen
 Slungshot, or slingshot, a maritime tool
 Slingshot, a part of a pinball machine

Amusement rides
 Slingshot ride, or reverse bungee, a type of amusement ride
 SlingShot (Cedar Fair), a reverse bungee ride at Cedar Fair amusement parks in Canada and the US

Vehicles
 Dodge Slingshot, a 2004 concept car
 Front engine dragster, or slingshot, a variety of drag race car
 Kolb Slingshot, an ultralight aircraft
 Polaris Slingshot, a three-wheeled motor vehicle
 Plymouth Slingshot, a 1988 concept car

Film, television and comics
 The Slingshot (film), a 1993 Swedish film
 Slingshot (2005 film), an American film
Slingshot (upcoming film), an upcoming American sci-fi film
SlingShot, a 2014 documentary about Segway inventor Dean Kamen
 The Slingshot, a 2009 South Korean television series
 Agents of S.H.I.E.L.D.: Slingshot, a 2016 American web series
 "Slingshot" (Thunderbirds Are Go), a television episode
 Slingshot (comics), a set index article listing several characters, including:
 Menagerie (Image Comics) or Slingshot
 Silk Spectre (Laurie Juspeczyk) or Slingshot, a character in the DC Comics series Watchmen
 Slingshot (Transformers), a television and comics character
 Yo-Yo Rodriguez, in Marvel Comics

Music
 Slingshot (band), an American disco/dance band
 Slingshot (album) or the title song, by Michael Henderson, 1981
 "Slingshot", a song by the Black Seeds from Solid Ground, 2008
 "Slingshot", a song by Gaelic Storm from Bring Yer Wellies, 2006
 "Slingshot", a song by Jimmy G and the Tackheads from Federation of Tackheads, 1985
 "Slingshot", a song by Lil Xan from Total Xanarchy, 2017

Other uses
 Sling swimsuit or slingshot
 Slingshot argument, a type of argument in philosophical logic
 Slingshot, a professional wrestling aerial technique

See also
Sling (disambiguation)